"Caribbean Blue" is a song by Irish musician Enya, included as the second track on her third studio album, Shepherd Moons (1991). It follows a waltz time signature, and mentions the Anemoi (Ancient Greek wind gods): Boreas, Afer Ventus (Africus), Eurus, and Zephyrus. The song was released as a single on 7 October 1991.

"Caribbean Blue" reached number eight on the Irish Singles Chart and number 13 on the UK Singles Chart. In the United States, it reached number 79 on the Billboard Hot 100 and number three on the Billboard Modern Rock Tracks chart;  on the latter listing, it was the 12th-most-successful song of 1992. The music video for the song features visual imagery based on the paintings of Maxfield Parrish, and was an early appearance for British actress and singer Martine McCutcheon.

Critical reception 
Ned Raggett from AllMusic noted that on the song, the singer 'avoids repeating the successful formula of "Orinoco Flow" by means of its waltz time—a subtle enough change, but one that colors and drives the overall composition and performance, the closest Enya might ever get to a dance number.'

Larry Flick from Billboard described it as 'dreamy and evocative' and 'multilayered and intricate'. He noted further that 'rich tapestry of sound lulls the listener with the promise of complex musical textures. Enya's understated vocals swell into effective wavelike crescendos that ebb and flow with the picturesque melody.'

David Browne from Entertainment Weekly called it 'a breathy, upbeat waltz that personifies everything Enya'. Pan-European magazine Music & Media wrote that 'it is as dreamy as her 1988 global hit "Orinoco Flow", but more dressed with instruments'. A reviewer from People Magazine stated that 'the Irish singer's angelic vocals lift this elegant and avant-garde waltz heavenward'.

Charts

Weekly charts

Year-end charts

Certifications

References

External links 
 

1991 singles
1991 songs
Enya songs
Songs with lyrics by Roma Ryan
Songs with music by Enya
Warner Music Group singles